= Candamius =

Astral god syncretised with Jupiter

Candamius is an astral god that was worshipped by Celts in Hispania. He is known from inscriptions and place-names in northern Spain. After the Roman conquest, he became syncretised with Jupiter.
